A grace is a short prayer or thankful phrase said before or after eating. The term most commonly refers to Christian traditions. Some traditions hold that grace and thanksgiving imparts a blessing which sanctifies the meal. In English, reciting such a prayer is sometimes referred to as "saying grace". The term comes from the Ecclesiastical Latin phrase gratiarum actio, "act of thanks." Theologically, the act of saying grace is derived from the Bible, in which Jesus and Saint Paul pray before meals (cf.). The practice reflects the belief that humans should thank God who is the origin of everything.

Christianity

Typical Christian grace prayers 

 Latin Catholic (before eating) – "Bless us, O Lord, for these, Thy gifts, which we are about to receive from Thy bounty. Through Christ, our Lord. Amen." (Preceded and followed by the Sign of the Cross. Also used by some German Lutherans.)
 Latin Catholic (after eating) – "We give Thee thanks, Almighty God, for all thy benefits, Who live and reign for ever and ever. Amen." (Preceded and followed by the Sign of the Cross.)
 Eastern Catholic and Eastern Orthodox (before eating) – "O Christ God, bless the food and drink of Thy servants, for holy art Thou, always, now and ever, and unto the ages of ages. Amen." (The one saying the prayer may make the Sign of the Cross over the food with his right hand).
 Eastern Catholic and Eastern Orthodox (after eating) – After the meal, all stand and sing: "We thank Thee, O Christ our God, that Thou hast satisfied us with Thine earthly gifts; deprive us not of Thy Heavenly Kingdom, but as Thou camest among Thy disciples, O Saviour, and gavest them peace, come unto us and save us." There are also seasonal hymns which are sung during the various Great Feasts. At Easter, it is customary to sing the Paschal troparion.
 Anglican "Bless, O Father, Thy gifts to our use and us to Thy service; for Christ’s sake. Amen."
 Lutheran (Luther's Blessing and Thanks at Meals) (before eating) "The eyes of all wait upon Thee, O Lord, and Thou givest them their meat in due season; Thou openest Thine hand and satisfied the desire of every living thing. Our Father... Lord God, Heavenly Father, bless us and these Thy gifts which we receive from Thy bountiful goodness, through Jesus Christ, our Lord. Amen." Or, alternatively, "The eyes of all look to you, O Lord, and you give them their food at the proper time. You open your hand and satisfy the desires of every living thing. Our Father... Lord God, Heavenly Father, bless us and these Thy/Your gifts which we receive from Thy/Your bountiful goodness. Through Jesus Christ our Lord. Amen."
 Lutheran (more commonly, the common table prayer) (before eating) "Come, Lord Jesus, be our Guest, and let Thy/these gifts to us be blessed. Amen."
 Lutheran (Luther's Blessing and Thanks at Meals) (after eating) "O give thanks unto the Lord, for He is good; for His mercy endures forever. (commonly ends here) He gives food to every creature; He provides food for the cattle and for the young ravens when they call. His pleasure is not in the strength of a horse, nor His delight in the legs of a man. The Lord delights in those who fear Him, who put their hope in His unfailing love. [Our Father...] We thank You, Lord God Heavenly Father, for all your benefits, through Jesus Christ our Lord, who lives and reigns with you and the Holy Spirit, forever and ever. Amen."
 Methodist/Wesleyan (Grace Before Meat) "Be present at our table Lord. Be here and everywhere adored. These mercies bless and grant that we may feast in fellowship with Thee. Amen." 
 Methodist/Wesleyan (Grace After Meat) "We thank thee, Lord, for this our food, But more because of Jesus' blood. Let manna to our souls be given, The Bread of Life, sent down from heaven. Amen."
 Moravian "Be present at our table, Lord. Be here and everywhere adored. From Thine all bounteous hand, our food may we receive with gratitude. Amen" (may be sung to hymn tune "Wareham" or "Old Hundredth")
 Moravian "Come Lord Jesus, our Guest to be and bless these gifts bestowed by Thee. Amen"
 Scots (The Selkirk Grace). "Some hae meat and canna eat, And some wad eat that want it; But we hae meat, and we can eat, Sae let the Lord be thankit."
 Australian (any denomination) "Come Lord Jesus, be our Guest, let this food of ours be blessed. Amen."
 Church of England, Common in British and Australian religious schools. "For what we are about to receive, may the Lord make us truly thankful/grateful. Amen."
 Used at some YMCA summer camps "Our Father, for this day, for our friends, for this food, we thank Thee. Amen."
 Protestant (Anglican, & Church of England) "For what we are about to receive may the Lord make us truly Grateful/Thankful, Amen."
 Presbyterian (Grace Before Meat) "Gracious God, we have sinned against Thee, and are unworthy of Thy mercy; pardon our sins, and bless these mercies for our use, and help us to eat and drink to Thy glory, for Christ’s sake. Amen."
 Presbyterian (Grace After Meat) "Blessed God, in Thee we live, move and have our being; make us thankful for Thy mercies; and as we live by Thy providence, help us to live to Thy praise looking and waiting for a better life with Thyself above, through Jesus Christ our Lord. Amen."
 Latin "In Nomine Patris, et Filii, et Spiritus Sancti. Amen. Benedic, Domine, nos et haec Tua dona, quae de Tua largitate sumus sumpturi. Per Christum Dominum nostrum. Amen."
 Latin (At the end of the meal) – "Agimus Tibi gratias, omnipotens Deus, pro universis beneficiis Tuis. Qui vivis et regnas in saecula saeculorum. Amen."

Sung grace 

German prayers to be sung before a meal include "Aller Augen warten auf dich" (All eyes are waiting for you) by Heinrich Schütz, after Psalm 145:15, and the anonymous 20th-century round "Segne, Vater, diese Gaben" (Bless Father, these gifts).

Judaism 

Before eating, a blessing is said based on the category of food that is being eaten. The categories are: (i) Bread, (ii) fruits that grow on a tree, (iii) fruits/vegetables that do not grow on a tree, (iv) derivates of the five grains (except for bread, which has its own blessing), (v) derivatives of grapes and (vi) everything else.

The Jewish mealtime prayer, after eating a meal that includes bread, is known as Birkat Hamazon. If the meal does not include bread, a blessing after the meal is recited based on the category of food that was eaten.

With the destruction of the Temple in Jerusalem in 70 AD, the offering of the prescribed sacrifices ceased in Judaism. Thereafter, the Rabbis prescribed the substitution of other ritual actions to fill this void in Jewish obedience to the Torah. The ritual washing of hands and eating of salted bread is considered to be a substitute for the sacrificial offerings of the kohanim (Jewish priests).

Though there are separate blessings for fruit, vegetables, non-bread grain products, and meat, fish, and dairy products, a meal is not considered to be a meal in the formal sense unless bread is eaten. The duty of saying grace after the meal is derived from : "And thou shalt eat and be satisfied and shalt bless the Lord thy God for the goodly land which he has given thee." Verse 8 of the same chapter says: "The land of wheat and barley, of the vine, the fig and the pomegranate, the land of the oil olive and of [date] syrup." Hence only bread made of wheat (which embraces spelt) or of barley (which for this purpose includes rye and oats) is deemed worthy of the blessing commanded in verse 10.

After the meal, a series of four (originally three) benedictions are said, or a single benediction if bread was not eaten.

Islam 
 Before eating:
 When meal is ready: "Allahumma barik lana fima razaqtana waqina athaban-nar. " (Translation: O God! Bless the food You have provided us and save us from the punishment of the hellfire.)
 While starting to eat: bismillah ("In the name of God") 
 On forgetting to say grace : Since each person says their grace individually, if someone forgets to say grace at the beginning, this supplication is made- "Bismillahi fee awalihi wa akhirihi." (In the name of God, in the beginning and the end.) 
 After eating: "Alhamdulillah il-lathi at'amana wasaqana waja'alana Muslimeen. (Praise be to God Who has fed us and given us drink, and made us Muslims.) or simply "Alhamdulillah." (Praise be to God.)

Baháʼí Faith 

The Baháʼí Faith has these two prayers, which are meant for those who wish to thank God before they eat:

"He is God! Thou seest us, O my God, gathered around this table, praising Thy bounty, with our gaze set upon Thy Kingdom. O Lord! Send down upon us Thy heavenly food and confer upon us Thy blessing. Thou art verily the Bestower, the Merciful, the Compassionate."  Mahmud's Diary* p327

"He is God! How can we render Thee thanks, O Lord? Thy bounties are endless and our gratitude cannot equal them. How can the finite utter praise of the Infinite? Unable are we to voice our thanks for Thy favors and in utter powerlessness we turn wholly to Thy Kingdom beseeching the increase of Thy bestowals and bounties. Thou art the Giver, the Bestower, the Almighty."  Mahmud's Diary* p327

 * https://bahai-library.com/zarqani_mahmuds_diary&chapter=all

Hinduism 
Hindus use the 24th verse of the 4th chapter of Bhagavad Gita as the traditional prayer or blessing before a meal. Once the food is blessed it becomes Prasad, or sanctified as holy

Which translates as 'The act of offering is God (Brahma), the oblation is God, By God it is offered into the fire of God, God is That which is to be attained by him who sees God in all.'

Sometimes, the 14th verse from the 15th chapter of Bhagavad Gita is used:

This translates as 'Becoming the life-fire in the bodies of living beings, mingling with the upward and downward breaths, I digest the four kinds of food.'

Traditional Maharashtrian grace invokes the Lord through the shloka of Sant Ramdas namely:

This translates as: Take the name of the Lord when putting a morsel into your mouth.

Buddhism 
In Buddhism different traditions have prayers that are said or chanted before meals.

In Japanese Zen a prayer on the "Five Reflections", Gokan-no-ge, are done before and after meals. This includes putting one's hands together and say "Itadakimasu"  ("I humbly receive") before eating a meal. Upon finishing a meal, the polite phrase . In response, the preparer often says .

Theravadan monks chant a reminder not to crave food.

In the Nichiren School of Buddhism a prayer is done to "repay the Four Favors", debts we owe to parents, sentient beings, leaders and The Buddha, Dharma and Sanga.

Other pre-meal traditions 

In Korea, it is customary to say "Jal meokgesseumnida" (잘 먹겠습니다) ("I will eat well'). The saying is not religious in nature, and usually only occurs when eating with someone else. Before eating grace in Korean is "주님, 은혜로이 주신 이 음식과 우리에게 강복하소서. 우리 주 예수 그리스도를 통하여 비나이다, 아멘".

In certain Boy Scout circles, especially in Missouri, the "S-F" grace (named after the S-F Scout Ranch in Knob Lick, Missouri) is often said, especially when people at the table are of mixed religions. The S-F grace gives thanks to a "great Spirit", but is not affiliated with any one religion.

Another common Boy Scout grace is the "Philmont Grace" (named after the Philmont Scout Ranch in New Mexico) or the "Wilderness Grace". It can be found in use wherever a troop has gone to Philmont, but is most common in the Western half of the United States. It goes: " For food, for raiment, / For life, for opportunities, / For friendship and fellowship, / We thank thee, O Lord."

See also 
Common table prayer
Direction of prayer
Fixed prayer times
Wilderness Grace
Christian child's prayer § Giving thanks

References

External links 

Mealtime Prayers from The Prayer Guide.
Grace at Meals article from The Catholic Encyclopedia.
Thanksgiving before and after Meals article from The Catholic Encyclopedia.

Prayer
Food and drink culture
Food and drink appreciation